The Devil, You + Me is the sixth studio album by German indie rock band The Notwist. It was released in 2008.

Critical reception
At Metacritic, which assigns a weighted average score out of 100 to reviews from mainstream critics, the album received an average score of 74% based on 22 reviews, indicating "generally favorable reviews."

Andy Kellman of AllMusic gave the album 3.5 stars out of five and said, "you might want to take it everywhere with you, even when you can only replay it in your mind." Dave Hughes of Slant Magazine gave the album three stars out of five, commenting that "it merely and consistently recalls the band's more emotionally satisfying earlier work, while rarely equaling or surpassing it."

Track listing

Charts

In 2010. It was awarded a silver certification from the Independent Music Companies Association which indicated sales of at least 30,000 copies throughout Europe.

References

Further reading

External links
 
 The Devil, You + Me Official N.A. website

2008 albums
The Notwist albums
City Slang albums